Alice in Chains is an American rock band formed in Seattle in 1987 by guitarist and vocalist Jerry Cantrell and drummer Sean Kinney, who then recruited bassist Mike Starr and original lead vocalist Layne Staley. Starr was replaced by Mike Inez in 1993. Although never officially disbanding, Alice in Chains was plagued by extended inactivity from 1996 onwards due to Staley's substance abuse, which resulted in his death in 2002. The band reunited in 2005 for a live benefit show and toured in 2006 with William DuVall taking over as lead vocalist full-time. The band has released three albums with DuVall sharing vocal duties with Cantrell.

Since its formation, Alice in Chains has released six studio albums, three EPs, three live albums, four compilations, and two DVDs. The band is known for its distinctive vocal style, which often included the harmonised vocals of Staley and Cantrell (and later Cantrell and William DuVall).

Table 

 The columns Title and Author list each song title and the writer(s) of each song, listed by last name only.
 The columns Recorded, Location, and Producer list the date that the song was recorded, the location of the studio or venue where the recording of the song took place, and the producer(s) of each song listed by last name.

See also 
Alice in Chains discography

References

External links
Official website
Alice in Chains – Songs on AllMusic

 
Songs recorded by Alice in Chains
21st century-related lists
Alice in Chains